The 2017 South American Artistic Gymnastics Championships were held in Cochabamba, Bolivia, November 30–December 2, 2017. The competition was organized by the Bolivian Gymnastics Federation and approved by the International Gymnastics Federation.

Participating nations

Medalists

Medal table

References

2017 in gymnastics
South American Gymnastics Championships
International gymnastics competitions hosted by Bolivia
2017 in Bolivian sport